R. B. Smith may refer to:

R. B. Smith (Hampshire cricketer) (active 1842-45)
 Richard Bernhard Smith (1901-1935), American songwriter
 Richard Baird Smith (1818-1861), British engineer officer in the East India Company
Richard Bowyer Smith (1837-1919), English-born Australian inventor

See also
List of people with the surname Smith#R